Liza Marie Hunter-Galvan (born 25 June 1969 in Auckland) is a long-distance runner from New Zealand. She qualified to run the Women's Marathon in both the 2004 Athens Olympic Games as well as the 2008 Beijing Olympics. She resides in San Antonio, Texas and has won the Marathon of the Americas on four occasions. During her collegiate career she competed for UTSA and won the 1992 SLC Cross Country individual title, helping lead the Roadrunners to their second of three straight league crowns, and also qualified for the NCAA Championships.

In August 2009 Hunter-Galvan admitted to taking the banned performance enhancing substance EPO three times in her career, all of which were in 2009, after failing a drug test on March 23, 2009. She was banned from competition for two years starting May 2009. Liza has gone on record to publicly apologize for her mistake and has never sought to represent New Zealand again. After the two year hiatus Liza was able to return to the sport in 2011 and competed at the San Antonio Rock 'n Roll Marathon where she ran a career best 2 hours, 29 minutes, 37 seconds. Liza was welcomed with vast community support and forgiveness related to her prior ban during the San Antonio race and beyond. Liza completed her 24 year running career by winning the woman's 2016 San Antonio Rock 'n Roll Marathon with a time of 2 hours, 57 minutes and 17 seconds. Hunter-Galvan is still listed on the New Zealand Olympics roll of honour. In 2018 Hunter-Galvan was indicted for welfare fraud in San Antonio, Texas. The charges were subsequently dropped after Hunter-Galvan entered into negotiations and agreed to a plea bargain where she paid an amount in restitution.

Achievements

References

1969 births
Living people
Athletes (track and field) at the 2004 Summer Olympics
Athletes (track and field) at the 2008 Summer Olympics
Doping cases in athletics
New Zealand expatriate sportspeople in the United States
New Zealand female long-distance runners
New Zealand sportspeople in doping cases
Olympic athletes of New Zealand
Athletes from Auckland
Track and field athletes from San Antonio
University of Texas at San Antonio alumni